Malembe Mpofu is a South African rugby union player for the  in the Currie Cup. His regular position is lock.

Mpofu was named in the  side for the 2022 Currie Cup Premier Division.

References

South African rugby union players
Living people
Rugby union locks
Leopards (rugby union) players
Pumas (Currie Cup) players
1996 births